Momtaz Al Ket is the former editor in chief of the Egyptian newspaper Akhbar El Yom.

References 

Year of birth missing (living people)
Living people
Egyptian journalists